The 184th Division was created in February 1949 under the Regulation of the Redesignations of All Organizations and Units of the Army, issued by Central Military Commission on November 1, 1948, basing on the 43rd Brigade, 15th Column of Huabei Military Region. Its history could be traced to 18th Military Sub-district of Taiyue Military District formed in 1946.

The division was composed of 550th, 551th and 552th Infantry Regiments. As a part of 61st Corps the division took part in the Chinese Civil War.

From April 1950, the division was combined with Xichang Military Sub-district.

In February 1951, the division's 550th and 551st Regiment were detached from the military sub-district and formed the new 184th Division with 554th Infantry Regiment from 185th Division. Artillery Regiment, 184th Division was activated simultaneously. The division then became a part of 10th Corps. In April, the division moved to Qinhuangdao, Hebei as the reserve force of the People's Volunteer Army.

In April 1952, the plan of deploying 10th Corps into Korea was cancelled. The 184th Divisions was then disbanded: 
Division HQ, along with HQ, 26th Tank Division and its 52nd Tank Regiment became 2nd Tank School;
550th Infantry Regiment was transferred to 28th Division as 54th Infantry Regiment;
551st Infantry Regiment was converted to 26th Engineer Regiment;
554th Infantry Regiment was converted to 27th Engineer Regiment.

References

Infantry divisions of the People's Liberation Army
Military units and formations established in 1949
Military units and formations disestablished in 1952